Kalyaneshwar Mandir is more-than-500-year-old Shiva temple situated in Bally, Howrah near Belurmath. It is very famous and visited by millions of monks and devotees around India every year. It is surrounded by Kali, Ganesh, Vishnu and Bajrangbali Temples.

History
The structure is about 400 years old and is said to have been started by the Pandavas and it was then continued by the Katoch Dynasty. According to legends, Ramakrishna Dev used to visit the temple frequently along with his followers and founder members of Ramakrishna Mission including Swami Vivekananda, Swami Brahmananda and others. This ritual is still followed by the monks of Ramakrishna Mission.

Festivals
The famous festivals in this temple are MahaShivaratri & Charaksankranti. A very famous puja (prayer) is organized for that purpose.

References

Shiva temples in West Bengal
Hindu temples in West Bengal
Buildings and structures in Howrah district